Golden talent of Ukraine is a unique national award for young Ukrainian footballers. Winners are determined on a basis of the calendar year results in two age categories – Under-21 (players who are not older than 21 at the end of the year) and Under-19 (players who are not older than 19 at the end of the year). Annual rating is based on monthly surveys of coaches, directors of sport schools, experts, journalists and fans. The final voting is held at the end of a year, to which the participants come with bonus points (for success in the monthly surveys).

The concept of the competition was developed by a football journalist named Andrii Kudyrko. In March 2013 the first monthly survey was held.

The competition conditions
Surveys are conducted in months when matches are played in the Ukrainian Championship (March, April, May, August, September, October and November, according to circumstances – June and July). Respondents call their top three of young and youthful players on a basis of the month results, their votes are summed up (1st place – 3 points, 2nd place – 2 points, 3rd place – 1 point). Indicators of monthly surveys form the annual ranking in both age categories – Under-21 and Under-19.

The top ten of a year is allowed for the final voting with bonus points (1st place – 10, 2nd – 9, ..., 10th – 1). Besides, the players who are trapped in the top 5 of a month at least once and got some bonus points (1st place – 5, 2nd – 4, ..., 5th – 1) are allowed to the final year voting. This ensures the objectivity of the competition – the players who played more consistently during a year (and not only last few months before the final voting) get additional promotion, in traditional polls the one wins more often who proved to be brighter than others at the finish, as recent events are more memorable.

The situation in the category Under-21 in 2013 clearly demonstrated that a complicated procedure of determining the winner in the competition Golden Talent of Ukraine is fair. Serhiy Bolbat got the most points in a year voting, he played the autumn excellent, but with the bonus points for the whole year Ivan Ordets celebrated total victory, who consistently played in spring and autumn.

Prizes
By the end of 2013 six best players (three winners in each of two age categories) received prizes provided by competition partners – diplomas, game shoes and watches.

The voting winners

2013

2014

2015

2016

2017

2018

2019

2020

2021

2022

References

External links

Ukrainian football trophies and awards
Awards established in 2013
2013 establishments in Ukraine